Summer Trees is a historic mansion near Red Banks, Mississippi.

Location
The mansion is located on Mayhome Road near Red Banks, Mississippi.

History
The mansion was built from 1820 to 1825. It was designed in the Greek Revival architectural style. It was purchased by Washington S. Taylor, the son of Sanders Washington Taylor, in 1851. Taylor sold it to pay off debts in the 1880s.

The mansion was left vacant from 1900 to 1935, until it was purchased by Mr and Mrs Neely Grant. The Grants restored it. In 1969, they sold it to Mr and Mrs Alfred Cowles, Jr.

Architectural significance
It has been listed on the National Register of Historic Places since January 19, 1979.

References

Greek Revival houses in Mississippi
Antebellum architecture
Houses on the National Register of Historic Places in Mississippi
National Register of Historic Places in Marshall County, Mississippi
Houses completed in 1825